The Henry Furniture Store Building is a historic commercial building at 107 West University in Siloam Springs, Arkansas.  It is a single-story brick building, with an angled recessed storefront topped by a raised brick parapet set above brick corbelling and a pressed metal cornice.  Built c. 1900, it is the best example in the city of commercial architecture from that time period.

The building was listed on the National Register of Historic Places in 1994.

See also
National Register of Historic Places listings in Benton County, Arkansas

References

Commercial buildings on the National Register of Historic Places in Arkansas
Beaux-Arts architecture in Arkansas
Commercial buildings completed in 1900
Buildings and structures in Siloam Springs, Arkansas
National Register of Historic Places in Benton County, Arkansas
Historic district contributing properties in Arkansas